Armada Szczecin was an American football team based in Szczecin, Poland, that participated in the American Football League in 2019, and the Polish Football League from 2020 to 2021. The team was formed in 2019, via the merge of teams Husaria Szczecin and Cougars Szczecin, and existed until 2021, when the team was disbanded.

History 
Armada Szczecin was formed in January 2019, via the merge of teams Husaria Szczecin and Cougars Szczecin. It was based in the city of Szczecin, Poland. The team participated in the 2019 season of the 2nd division American Football League of Poland. The club manager was Tomasz Leszczyński.

It was planed for the team to debut in the 1st division American Football League in the 2020 season, which however was cancelled due to the COVID-19 pandemic. As such, the team participated in the nine-man football division of the Polish Football League, in which, it won the champion title. The team also participated in the 2021 season of the nine-man football conference, where it lost the finals to the Bielawa Owls.

Due to the bad financial situation, the team was disbanded in November 2021, after the end of the season.

References 

American football teams in Poland
Sport in Szczecin
American football teams established in 2019
American football teams disestablished in 2021
2019 establishments in Poland
2021 disestablishments in Poland